The following data is current as of the end of the 2022 season, which ended after the 2023 College Football Playoff National Championship. The following list reflects the records according to the NCAA. Not all wins and losses in this list have occurred in the highest level of play, but are recognized by the NCAA. Percentages are figured to 3 decimal places. In the event of a tie, the team with the most wins is listed first.

American Athletic Conference

Atlantic Coast Conference

Big 12 Conference

Big Ten Conference

Conference USA

Independent

Mid-American Conference

Mountain West Conference

Pac-12 Conference

Southeastern Conference

Sun Belt Conference

References

 

Lists of college football team records